Bulgarian Americans are Americans of Bulgarian descent.

For the 2000 United States Census, 55,489 Americans indicated Bulgarian as their first ancestry, while 92,841 persons declared to have Bulgarian ancestry. Those can include Bulgarian Americans living in the United States for one or several generations, dual Bulgarian American citizens, or any other Bulgarian Americans who consider themselves to be affiliated to both cultures or countries.

Bulgarian Americans include persons born in Bulgaria, in the United States, and in other countries with ethnic Bulgarian population. Because some Bulgarians are not American citizens, others are dual citizens, and still others' ancestors came to the U.S. several generations ago, some of these people consider themselves to be simply Americans, Bulgarians, Bulgarians living in the United States or American Bulgarians.

After the 2000 U.S. census, in the recent years the population grew significantly — according to the general assessments of Bulgarian diplomatic representations in the US for 2010, there are 250,000 Bulgarians residing in the country, and more than 30,000 students.

History
Bulgarian immigration to the United States began in the mid 19th century. According to Mihaela Robila they tended to settle in Slavic enclaves in the Midwest or Northeast. David Cassens has published a study of 'The Bulgarian Colony of Southwestern Illinois 1900-1920'. To Chicago and Back, (Bulgarian:"До Чикаго и назад") by the eminent Bulgarian author Aleko Konstantinov; first published in 1894 mostly concerns attendance at a trade fair, not emigration per se. According to the 2000 census, the highest number of Bulgarians lived in the cities of New York, Los Angeles, Chicago and Miami.

The United States has one of the highest numbers of Bulgarians of any country in the world. As many as 250,0001 Bulgarians live in the country. From the Eastern European countries, Bulgaria has the second highest number of students who study in the United States, after Russia.

Demographics
The 2000 United States Census shows that there were 63,000 people of Bulgarian descent in the US. According to the same source, the state with the largest number of Bulgarians is California, followed by Illinois, New York, Florida, Ohio, and Indiana. Texas, more specifically Houston, also has a growing population.
According to the 2000 US census the cities with the highest number of Bulgarian Americans are New York, Los Angeles, Chicago and Miami. Approximately 60% of Bulgarian Americans over the age of 25 hold a bachelor's degree or higher. In 2015, out of 61,377 ethnic Bulgarians born outside the United States, 57,089 were born in Bulgaria, 37 in North Macedonia and 46 in Greece.

Bulgarian Americans have an annual median household income of $76,862. Following the 2000 US census when Bulgarians were 50-100,000, during the last 10 years their number has grown significantly to over 250,000.

Bulgarian-born population
Bulgarian-born population in the US since 2010:

Language

According to the 2000 US Census, 28,565 people indicated that they speak Bulgarian at home in 2000. But in the recent years the number grew significantly to over 250,000 people. Some Bulgarian Americans speak Bulgarian, especially the more recent immigrants, while others might not speak the language at all, or speak Bulgarian mixed with English to a lesser or greater extent.

Some Bulgarian Americans understand Bulgarian even though they might not be able to speak the language. There are cases where older generations of Bulgarians or descendants of Bulgarian immigrants from the early part of the 20th century are fluent in the Bulgarian language as well.

Notable people

 John Vincent Atanasoff (1903–1995) – inventor of the first automatic electronic digital computer
 Miroslav Barnyashev – professional wrestler who worked as "Rusev" and currently, "Miro"
 Christo – world-famous artist known for projects such as The Gates and The Wrapped Reichstag
 Carolyn Christov-Bakargiev – writer, art historian, and curator
 Bill Danoff – songwriter and singer [Bill does not have Bulgarian heritage, despite the name, according to the man himself.]
 Kiradjieff brothers, creators of Cincinnati chili
 Stephane Groueff (1922–2006) – writer and journalist who wrote the book Manhattan Project: The Untold Story of the Making of the Atomic Bomb
 Assen Jordanoff (1896–1967) – aviation constructor with a global recognition
 Dan Kolov (1892–1940) – early 20th century wrestler 
 Ted Kotcheff – film and television director and producer (First Blood, Weekend at Bernie's)
 Leah LaBelle (1986–2018) – singer and finalist on American Idol
 Alex Maleev – comic book illustrator and artist best known for the Marvel Comics' series Daredevil (vol. 2), collaborating with writer Brian Michael Bendis
 Angela Nikodinov – figure skater
 Victor Ninov – nuclear physicist
 Peter Petroff (1919–2003) – inventor, engineer, NASA scientist, and adventurer
 Maria Popova – writer, critic, and blogger; named among the "100 Most Creative People in Business" by Fast Company in 2012
 Svetla Protich – classical pianist
 Vladimir Tenev – billionaire, co-founder of Robinhood, entrepreneur 
 Andre Roussimoff (1946–1993) – professional wrestler known as André the Giant
 Dimitar Sasselov – astronomer and professor at Harvard University
 Kyril Vassilev (1908–1987) – portrait painter of royalty and American society during the mid-20th century
 Sam Voinoff (1907–1989) – college golf coach at Purdue University, with 10 Big Ten, and 1 NCAA championships.
Sophia Popov – professional golfer, of Bulgarian and German ancestry
Pete George –  weightlifter and Olympic and World champion
Jim George – weightlifter
Stoyan Chrstowe –  author, journalist and noted Vermont political figure

See also
 Bulgarian Eastern Orthodox Diocese of the USA, Canada and Australia
 Macedonian Patriotic Organization
 St. John of Rila Church (Chicago)
 Bulgaria–United States relations

Notes
Estimates of the Agency for Bulgarians Abroad for the numbers of ethnic Bulgarians living for the country in question based on data from the Bulgarian Border Police, the Bulgarian Ministry of Labour and reports from immigrant associations. The numbers include members of the diaspora (2nd and 3rd generation descendants of Bulgarian immigrants), legal immigrants, illegal immigrants, students and other individuals permanently residing in the country in question as of 2004.

References

Further reading
 Altankov, Nikolay G. The Bulgarian-Americans. Palo Alto, Calif.: Ragusan Press, 1979.
 Auerbach, Susan (ed.). Encyclopedia of Multiculturalism. New York: Marshall Cavendish, 1994.
 Carlson, Claudia and David Allen. The Bulgarian Americans. New York: Chelsea House, 1990. 
 Moody, Suzanna, Joel Wurl; Rudolph J Vecoli (eds.). The Immigration History Research Center: A Guide to Collections. New York: Greenwood Press, 1991.
 Riggs, Thomas. Gale Encyclopedia of Multicultural America, Vol. 1. 3rd ed. Farmington Hills: Gale, 2000.
 Yankoff, Peter Dimitrov. Peter Menikoff: The Story of a Bulgarian Boy in the Great American Melting Pot. Nashville, Tenn.: Cokesbury Press, 1928.

External links

 "Bulgarian Americans" by Eleanor Yu. Material on Everyculture.com
 Bulgarian Children's Chorus and School Gergana, New York
 Helping Hands Bulgaria
Immigration History Research Center Archives, University of Minnesota Libraries
The 90th Birthday of Professor Raphael Mechoulam, a Top Cannabinoid Scientist and Pioneer

 
 
European-American society